Mariana Fernández de Córdoba y Ayala (c. 1394 – 1431), also known as Mariana de Ayala Córdoba y Toledo, was the fourth Lady of Casarrubios del Monte in the province of Toledo.  She was the daughter of Diego Fernández de Córdoba y Carrillo, first Lord of Baena, and Inés Ayala y Toledo, third Lady of Casarrubios del Monte.

Life 
Mariana married Fadrique Enríquez de Mendoza, Admiral of Castile and Lord of Medina de Rioseco around July 1425.  They had one daughter, Juana Enríquez (1425–1468), who married  John II of Aragon.

References 
Cañas Galvez, Francisco. “Colección diplomática de Santo Domingo el Real de Toledo”. Madrid: Silex Ediciones (2010)

Footnotes

External links 
Genealogy of Medieval Spain

1394 births
1431 deaths
Year of birth uncertain
15th-century Castilian nobility
14th-century Castilian nobility
14th-century Spanish women
15th-century Spanish women